Charles George Reid (April 14, 1892 – November 23, 1953) was an amateur and professional ice hockey goaltender who played in various professional and amateur leagues, including the Pacific Coast Hockey Association and Western Canada Hockey League. Amongst the teams he played with were the Edmonton Eskimos, Calgary Wanderers, Calgary Tigers and Vancouver Maroons. He was born in Calgary, Alberta.

Charlie Reid appeared with the Calgary Tigers in the 1924 Stanley Cup finals, a best-of-three series the Tigers lost to the Montreal Canadiens of the NHL over two games (1-6, 0-3).

External links

1892 births
1953 deaths
Calgary Tigers players
Canadian ice hockey goaltenders
Ice hockey people from Calgary
Vancouver Maroons players
Western Canada Hockey League players